Changchun Longjia International Airport  is an international airport in Jilin Province, China, for which it is an aviation hub in China's Civil Airport System. Changchun Airport is a regional hub for China Southern Airlines.

History

Longjia International Airport was approved for construction in 1998. Construction started on 29 May 2003, and the airport began its operations on 27 August 2005. It is named after Longjia, the town where it is located. It replaced the dual-use civil and military Changchun Dafangshen Airport, which reverted to sole military use. Commercial flights of Jilin Ertaizi Airport were also transferred to Longjia on 3 October 2005. According to original designs in 1998, the airport is estimated to serve only 2 million passengers, but the Municipal Government rejected this design, believing it would soon be insufficient for the city's needs, which later turned out to be a wise decision. However, due to this delay, the redesign of the airport did not start until July 2001.

The airport was later expanded in 2009, the construction added two more gates with air bridges to the international section of the terminal, and enlarged the apron to the airport. The construction was finished in May, 2011. The airport is now able to accommodate long-distance wide-body jets such as the Boeing 747. The terminal, which was expanded to its present size in 2009, encompasses . of space. It was predicted that by 2015, the airport will be able to handle 6.5 million passengers per year. As in the year 2013, Changchun Airport received a passenger flow of 6.7 million, surpassing its original capacities, also making it the 30th busiest airport in Mainland China in terms of passenger services.

The airport serves most major cities in China and East Asia, with scheduled international flights to Bangkok, Seoul, Singapore, Tokyo, Osaka, Hong Kong, Taipei and so on. In 2021, it gained direct access to Europe when Air China started flights to Frankfurt. It is the one of the major international gateways in North-eastern China.

Airlines and destinations

Passenger

Cargo

Public transportation
Changchun Longjia is serviced by the Longjia railway station, a railway station of the Changchun–Jilin intercity railway located at the basement of the terminal. The airport is also serviced by coaches, which ferry passengers to and from Quan'an Square (also known as Nanguan Urban Terminal), Renmin Square, and Weixing Square in Changchun, and Jiangcheng Square in Jilin.  Coach services to Changchun are available every day, from the first takeoff to the last arrival.

The planned Line 9 of Changchun Rail Transit will also stop here.

See also
List of airports in China

References

External links
 Official website 
 
 
 

Airports in Jilin
Transport in Changchun
Airports established in 2005
2005 establishments in China